"Share That Love" is a song by Danish pop and soul band Lukas Graham, featuring American rapper G-Eazy. It was released on 21 August 2020 by Warner Records. The song was written by Dave Gibson, Digital Farm Animals, Gerald Earl Gillum, Lukas Forchhammer, Morten Ristorp and Neil Ormandy.

Background
In a statement, Lukas Forchhammer said, "I grew up in a neighbourhood where if you had something, you shared it. The place is called Christiania. It's an old army base that got squatted in 1971. The community operates from the concept that nobody owns their house and that you can do what you want, as long as you don’t inhibit others from doing what they want. For all the upsides to living in Christiania, there was also trouble with the police, or issues with gangs in the city. I've tried to embody all of that in this song, and when I listen to it I'm reminded of some of the ways our community has really come together, like all the great parties we've thrown, or the huge protests where we've marched against the government threatening to evict us from Christiania. In these troubling times, I guess it is more important than ever to share what we have, especially your love."

Lyric video
A lyric video to accompany the release of "Share That Love" was first released onto YouTube on 20 August 2020. The video shows the band painting a massive 'Share That Love' mural on a landmark music venue in Lukas' hometown of Christiania in Copenhagen, Denmark. The mural was created by acclaimed Copenhagen street artist Rasmus Balstrøm.

Music video
A music video to accompany the release of "Share That Love" was first released onto YouTube on 30 September 2020. The video was directed by Marc Klasfeld.

Live performances
The song was performed on the American morning television show Good Morning America.

Credits and personnel
Credits adapted from Tidal.
 Morten Ristorp – Producer, background vocals, drums, guitar, percussion, piano, writer
 Dave Gibson – Background Vocals, writer
 Sean Hurley – Bass
 Jyvonne Haskin – Choir
 Lydia René – Choir
 Ronnie OHannon – Choir
 William "B.A." Washington – Choir, vocal production
 Gerald Earl Gillum – Featured Artist, vocals, writer
 Randy Merrill – Masterer
 Mark "Spike" Stent – Mixer
 David LaBrel – Recording Engineer
 Emil Falk – Recording Engineer
 Lukas Forchhammer – Vocals, writer
 Digital Farm Animals – Writer
 Neil Ormandy – Writer

Charts

Weekly charts

Year-end charts

Certifications

Release history

References

2020 singles
2020 songs
G-Eazy songs
Lukas Graham songs
Music videos directed by Marc Klasfeld
Songs written by Digital Farm Animals
Songs written by G-Eazy
Songs written by Lukas Forchhammer
Songs written by Morten Ristorp
Songs written by Neil Ormandy
Warner Records singles